Kunturiri (Aymara kunturi condor, -(i)ri a suffix, Hispanicized spelling Condoriri) is a  mountain in the Bolivian Andes. It lies in the La Paz Department, Murillo Province, Palca Municipality, west of the Cordillera Real. Kunturiri is situated south-west of the mountain Janq'u Qalani between the villages of Laqayani (Lacayani) in the south-west and Tarujiri in the north-east.

References 

Mountains of La Paz Department (Bolivia)